Carlos Micháns (born Carlos Eduardo Micháns; 18 August 1950) is a Dutch composer, writer and draughtsman of Argentine origin. He lives in the Netherlands since 1982. His works (from solo pieces to large compositions for choir and orchestra) are published in The Hague by Donemus. Micháns is also a writer. He has published poetry, short stories, novels and a series of essays on Argentine history. From 1995 to 2012 he was in charge of Podium Neerlandés, a program of Radio Nederland (the Dutch international broadcast) for Latin American audiences featuring recordings made in the Netherlands' major concert halls. One of Micháns' ancestors was the Argentine-born, anglo-American composer Mildred Couper (1887-1974), a pioneer of microtonal music in the US.

Biography

Early years in Argentina

Born in Buenos Aires into a middle-class family with Spanish, French, English, Scottish and North American (USA) ancestry, Micháns started taking piano and theory lessons at seven, but gave up after a few years. According to the composer himself, he found theory and solfège boring and just wanted to play what he heard and compose his own tunes. At twelve he decided to give himself a second chance and returned to piano and theory lessons. He never again stopped studying until he graduated from university. Still a teenager, he was encouraged by his piano teacher Almah Melgar to play his own compositions at the yearly students concerts held at a well-known piano shop in downtown Buenos Aires. This first taste of success, though brief and modest, made him decide to become a composer. However, his first lessons in composition at seventeen with Roberto García Morillo, a major figure in Argentine music, did not prove a great success, which Micháns attributed to his teacher’s lack of pedagogical skill and insight. At the same time he studied harmony, counterpoint and fugue with Susana Oliveto, a young and knowledgeable woman composer who would become his true musical mentor and a lifelong friend. In 1967 he was granted a two-year scholarship by Almah Melgar which enabled him to study organ with her husband Carlos Larrimbe, a renowned choir conductor and organist at St. Saviour’s Church in Buenos Aires. The prospective of a future as an organist and eventual successor to his teacher, however, came to an abrupt end when the latter succumbed to a massive heart attack less than a year later. Disorientated by this sudden change of scenario, he nevertheless continued his studies of choir and orchestra conducting at the University of Buenos Aires and the Art Institute of Argentina's major opera house, Teatro Colón, which he completed almost simultaneously in 1973.

Changing plans
Almost certain of a job at the theater once he graduated, his hopes were again cut short by a new blow of fate. The political unrest in Argentina in the early 1970s and the return to power of the corrupt peronist regime brought about a reorganization of the theater and the reincorporation of staff previously dismissed by the former board of directors. It also caused Pedro Valenti Costa, head of the Art Institute and directly responsible for Micháns' eventual appointment as an assistant conductor, to resign. A few years of uncertainty about his future followed, during which he took up drawing and sculpting (he even held a couple of public exhibitions) and enrolled in the Faculty of Veterinary, which he believed might provide a safer source of income in cattle-land Argentina. This new venture, however, was short lived, and he quit the faculty after a few months, since constant demonstrations by the militant peronist youth on the one hand and aggressive indoctrination by left-wing teachers on the other, made studying almost impossible. In 1976, Micháns decided to return to music and managed to secure a monthly salary as a music teacher, which he later traded for a more lucrative and relaxed position as a private English teacher. Although he never ceased to compose, his output was limited (partly due to lack of time) and hardly ever played, except for a few minor pieces for piano, organ and choir. A significant breakthrough was the performance in 1981 of his Three Pieces for Chamber Orchestra by the National Symphonic Orchestra, which, although warmly reviewed, he later discarded.

The Netherlands: a new beginning
Back from a short visit to the Netherlands in 1981, Micháns applied for a scholarship from the Dutch government which would enable him to free himself from work and other obligations and concentrate purely on composition. Although the scholarship came through, the sudden outbreak of the Falkland War threatened to frustrate his plans once again (the Netherlands were natural allies to the British). He only obtained his permit after Argentina’s defeat and left for the Netherlands in August 1982. At the Utrecht Conservatorium, at the time one of the Netherlands' most prestigious and international music schools, he took lessons from Hans Kox, Joep Straesser, Ton Bruynèl (electronic music) and Tristan Keuris. During this new phase as an adult student (he was already thirty two), Micháns could not only fully concentrate on composition, as he had hoped, but also explore other styles and composition techniques. Soon after obtaining his diploma in 1987 he decided to become a Dutch citizen. He has resided in Utrecht ever since.

France
Since 2011, Micháns divides his time between the Netherlands and France, where, apart from composing, he organises concerts and participates in other cultural activities, mainly in the northeastern region of Champagne-Ardenne. In 2019, together with economist and art-lover Marcel Peek, he founded the "Centre Culturel Arteméum" in the historical town of Langres (Haute-Marne). The main aim of the Centre is to hold exhibitions of Micháns' comprehensive art collections, which cover various fields (paintings, drawings, textiles) and cultures (Europe, Africa, Asia and the Americas). Arteméum also collaborates with other cultural institutions and/or events in Langres, such as the Journées du Patrimoine and the Rencontres Philosophiques de Langres. In 2020, on the occasion of "Paris-Bourdelle-Buenos Aires", Arteméum obtained the collaboration of the Bourdelle Museum in Paris and the Ingres-Bourdelle Museum in Montauban. Both prestigious institutions supplied copies in facsimile of rare documents relating to Antoine Bourdelle and his work for Argentina, which was one of the main topics of the exhibit. In 2022, Arteméum held an exhibition of Ukrainian art from the Micháns' collection, aimed at raising funds for the children of Ukraine. The money raised was then donated to UNICEF. Arteméum also dedicated an exhibit to Saul Lishinksy (1922-2012), a major though unjustly forgotten figure in American art of the 20th century.

Afroccidentalism

A word created by Carlos Micháns to define the works by (black) African artists in western (European) style, yet strongly African in character.

Examples of this art are the carvings of heads and figures depicting African men and women, whether nude or wearing traditional clothes and elaborate hairstyles. These rarely signed works, which may also include paintings, were produced in large quantities throughout sub-Saharan Africa during most of the 20th century. They were generally meant as decorative items for the western market, unlike traditional objects with primarily religious or ritualistic purposes.

Because many of these objects reveal considerable technical skill in spite of their relative lack of personality, it is Micháns’ strong belief that they cannot be lightly discarded as “popular” or “traditional” art, which tends to imply little or no artistic value. In that perspective, the same could be said of countless objects produced in Europe and other parts of the world over the centuries, and often considered as “objets d’art” or simply “art” by western scholars.

The term “afroccidentalism” aims at placing this form of west-oriented African art on the same level as other well known “isms” in western art, such as “orientalism”, “africanism” and even “modernism”, which take nothing off the artistic value of the works or schools they refer to.

One remarkable feature of “afroccidentalism” is that, by portraying African individuals from different cultures and regions in their traditional attires and hairstyles, it preserves a three-dimensional, realistic image of a world that is rapidly changing and, were it not thanks to photography, films and these true-to-life objects, would completely be forgotten.

It must be added, however, that contemporary art produced in many African countries today can hardly be regarded as an example of “afroccidentalism”, even if western techniques and styles may be recognised in the works of many African artists. Whereas the African “reference” is often present in their production, it is not in a merely folkloristic or “tribal” sense, but purely as a genuine addition to a stream of contemporary art still building up its own personality, however fragmented and diversified this may be.

Furthermore, one must not forget that today’s Africa has, in some countries more than in others, adopted a way of life which mirrors western culture in many aspects, while remaining true to its roots and ancient traditions. Where a white population is present, this, too, can be said about the European element in its artistic language.

The music
Far from denying his South American roots and musical background, including elements from Argentina’s rich folk music and rhythms, Micháns regards them as components of his personality, although not essential to his musical language. On the other hand, sustained exposure to new music from all over the world rarely heard in Argentina, would result in a gradual updating of his regular style (strongly influenced by the free and aggressive dissonances of Bartók and Prokofiev), without breaking with tradition altogether. Never interested in experimentation for its own sake, he nevertheless adopted certain aspects of serialism and minimalism, discovered the music of Olivier Messiaen, Witold Lutoslawski and Henri Dutilleux (to name just a few) and blended his findings into a uniform and distinctive style of his own. More recently, he has added a few Asian elements to his palette, as a result of his frequent visits (both privately and on tour with other musicians) to India and Indonesia. This is particularly evident in his Sinfonia Concertante Nr. 4, the choral work Tirthankara, Purana for saxophone and piano and Dradivian Moods for oboe and string quartet. In his view, any style, culture or period may supply useful material and enrich the grammar of music, and it is up to the composer to select and combine the elements most suited to his needs, in order to configure a widely accessible, yet personal and distinctive language. This new approach is clear in one of Micháns' major piano works, Apparitions, composed for the outstanding Dutch pianist Ronald Brautigam in 1990 and which the composer himself regards as a turning point in his creative career. A few years earlier than Apparitions, the Magnificat for soprano and choir also reflects Micháns' affinity with vocal music and his former training as a choir conductor. Combining rich, dissonant harmonies and a counterpoint with strong roots in polyphonic tradition, it is the first of a long series of works which would gradually establish his name in the Netherlands' rich choral life. Writing almost exclusively on commission, Micháns' output since his arrival in the Netherlands has grown steadily. At present, his catalog includes works for all sorts of instrumental combinations, from solos to major compositions for choir and orchestra. His list of chamber and choral music features a number of titles regularly performed by Dutch and international musicians and ensembles. Several of his compositions, which are published in The Hague by Donemus, have been released on CD. Among the musicians and ensembles of international stature which have performed music by Carlos Micháns are: Isabelle van Keulen (vl.), Ronald Brautigam (pn.), Michael Collins (cl.), Liza Ferschtman (vl.), Tjeerd Top (vl.) Dmitry Ferschtman (vc.), Remy van Kesteren (harp), Arno Bornkamp (sax.), Pieter Wispelwey (vc.), Marcio Carneiro (vc.), Lavinia Meijer (hp.), Udo Reinemann (baritone), Thierry Fischer (cond.), Kenneth Montgomery (cond.), Etienne Siebens (cond.), Utrecht String Quartet, Aurelia Saxophone Quartet, Duo Imaginaire (clarinet & harp), Het Reizend Muziekgezelschap (Amsterdam Chamber Music Society), Rotterdam Philharmonic Orchestra, Orkest van het Oosten, Radio Kamer Filharmonie, Groot Omroepkoor (the major choir of the Dutch Broadcasting Company), Holland Symfonia and Hagen Philharmonisches Orchester (Germany).

Literary work
Initially not intended for publication, Micháns' first serious literary endeavours date back to the 1970s, when he started writing short stories and poetry. It was not until after his first visits to India in the early 1990s that he decided to publish limited editions of his travel stories (The Eyes of Meenakshi), legends (The Merchant of Poompuhar) and a novel (Madurai, Madurai) based on Indian traditions and religion. The primary goal of these publications, however, was neither literary nor commercial, but to serve as fund-raisers for humanitarian projects in South India in which Micháns was then involved. He later continued to explore and write on other subjects, including autobiographical stories (Rogelio G.) and an essay on aspects of Argentina’s history up to 1982 (It Rains Red in Buenos Aires). Among his recent works are a new series of Indian stories, animal stories, an introduction to aspects of Mongolian religious art, several poetry albums and essays on art of Africa, Ukraine and the work of American artist Saul Lishinsky (1922-2012). In addition, from 1995 to 2012 Micháns was a free-lance writer and editor for Podium Neerlandés, a classical music program of the Dutch international broadcasting station Radio Nederland for Spanish speaking, mainly Latin American audiences.

Selected works

Solo

Tema, Toccata y Fuga (organ, 1977)

Aria (organ, 1981–82)

Diferencias y Fuga en Modo Arcaico (organ, 1981–82)

Tres Movimientos Perpetuos (piano, 1982)

Cinq Pièces de Clavecin (1983, rev. 1995)

Violin Sonata Nr. 1 (1983)

Rapsodia (for vl. or va., 1983)

Musique pour Saxophone (1984)

In Alta Solitudine (Sonata Nr. 2, violin, 1986)

Cello Sonata (1987)

Three Minimal Preludes (piano, 1987)

Apparitions (piano, 1990)

Burlesque (violin, 1990)

Viola Sonata (1993)

Suite en Noir (bass clarinet, 1993)

Trois Impromptus (piano, 1994)

Cinq Réflexions (sur un thème de Béla Bartók) (violin, 1995)

Cinq-Plus-Cinq (Etude-Caprice pour la harpe a dix doigts) (2010)

Mouvements Éclatants (pour harpe à dix doigts) (2011)

Cinq Prières de Détresse (organ, 2014)

Deux Improvisations (sur le Kyrie de la Messe "Cum Iubilo", pour orgue, 2018)

Trois Moments d'Orphée (harp, 2022)

Trois Études pour la Main Droite (piano, 2023)

Chamber music
Musica Funebris (cl., vc., pn., 1983-84)

Divertimento for Five Trumpets (1985)

Music for Harp and Clarinet (1985)

3 Pezzi per Piano e Marimba (1986)

Concerto per cinque Nr. 1 (cl., tr., vl., vc., pn., 1986)

Clarinet Quartet (1986)

String Quartet Nr. 1 (1988, rev. 1990)

Episodes for 18 players (1989)

Four movements for cello & piano (1989)

Saxophone Quartet Nr. 1 (1989)

String Quartet Nr. 2 (1992)

Concerto da Camera (violin and ensemble, 1993)

Piano Quintet (1994)

Saxophone Quartet Nr. 2 (1998)

Après Minuit (sop.sax., violin, harp, perc., pn., 1998)

Purana (alto saxophone and piano, 1999)

Divertimento for eight strings (Variations on a Tamil Lyric, 2000)

L’Ange Maudit (violin and piano, 2000)

Igoriana (Three glances at The Rite of Spring) (cl., vl., va., vc., d-b, pn., 2001)

Piano Quartet (2001)

Entre Nous (Trois Scènes pour violon en violoncelle)(2003)

Trois Étoffes Anciennes (viola and piano, 2003)

Joy (version for 3 pianos, 2007)

Dravidian Moods (oboe and string quartet, 2007/08)

Trois Portraits de l'Amour (viola and piano, 2009)

Del Sur (violin, alto saxophone and piano, 2011)

Four City Nocturnes (tenor saxophone and piano, 2012)

Fünf Kommentare zu "Ich ruf zu dir..." (clarinet and harp, 2012)

The Frozen Lake (saxophone, violin and harp, 2012)

La Mort d'Euterpe (violin, viola and organ, 2013)

Improvisation sur "Ich ruf zu dir..." (violin and organ, 2014)

Trois Airs Anciens (Crescentini, Méhul, Latour, for cl., vc. and fortepiano, 2014)

Chant d'Amour (violin, saxophone, piano, 2015–16)

Improvisation sur "Ich ruf zu dir..." (version for violin, saxophone & piano, 2016)

Triade (violin, viola, 2016)

Lacrimae (String Quartet Nr. 3, 2016)

Lachrimae Aeternae (after Dowland-Sweelinck, for string quartet, 2017/18)

Canta, canta mais (after Tom Jobim, for clarinet, violin, cello and harp, 2019)

Urban Suite (for two saxophones, 2019/20)

Trimurti (for flute, clarinet & piano, 2021)

Durga's Dance (soprano saxophone, bass clarinet & accordion, 2021)

Improvisation sur "Ich ruf'zu dir..." (version for string kwartet, 2022)

Improvisation sur "Ich ruf'zu dir..." (version for soprano saxophone & string trio, 2022)

Le Fugitif (string quartet, 2022)

Broken Dances (saxophone trio, 2022)

Songs
Cinco canciones de amor (Pablo Neruda, baritone and piano, 1988)

Vijf monogrammen (Ida Gerhardt, female voice and piano, 1994)

Terracotta (Antony Heidweiller, tenor and piano, 1994)

The Fall (John Wilmot, tenor and piano, 2008)

Choir
J'ai étranglé mon frère (R. Char, choir a cappella, 1976, rev. 2014)

Du Dunkelheit (Rilke, 1978)

Verklärter Herbst (Trakl, 1978)

Magnificat (soprano and choir, 1985)

Zes Gelderse Gedichten (Gerhardt, Van Duinkerken, Achterberg, 1986)

Herbstlieder (Rilke, 1989)

Salmos (Quevedo, 1992)

Le Cortège d'Orphée (Apollinaire, choir and accordion ensemble, 1993)

Six épigrammes (Martialis, choir, harp & string quintet, 1993, rev. 1995)

Et Nova sunt Semper (Ovid, choir and wind quintet, 1995)

Tres Plegarias (Micháns, choir and 12 winds, 1999)

Dos Tangos (Micháns, choir, bandoneón, piano, 2 vls., va., vc. and d-b, 2000)

Dos Abismos (Micháns, female choir, 2008)

Ave Maria – Pater Noster (mixed choir a cappella, 2010)

Apostrophe (mixed choir a cappella, 2012)

Cherished Dream (mixed choir a cappella, 2014)

Orchestra
Sinfonia Concertante Nr. 1 (2 vls. and string orchestra, 1987)

Joy (a minimal overture) (1987)

Concerto Breve (1990)

Mouvements Concertants (piano, perc. and string orchestra, 1991)

Alternances (saxophone quartet and string orchestra, 1995)

Sinfonia Concertante Nr. 2 (vl., vc., and orchestra, 1996)

Phoenix (symphonic overture, 1997)

Kaleidos (Sinfonia Concertante Nr. 3, vl., cl., pn. and orchestra, 2000)

Sinfonia Concertante Nr. 4 (vl., va. and orchestra, 2002)

Concerto for Harp and Orchestra (2006)

Concerto for Saxophone and Orchestra (2009)

Sinfonia Concertante Nr. 5 ("Imaginaire") (cl., harp and orchestra, 2010)

Voice/Choir and Orchestra
Syrinx (Ovidius, choir and orchestra, 1990)

Correspondences (De Nerval, Flaubert, Baudelaire, baritone, choir and orchestra, 1991)

Quid Hoc Dementiae Est? (Erasmus, double choir and orchestra, 2004)

Sinfonia Trajectina (Micháns, choir and orchestra, 2005/06)

And Nothing Death (John Wilmot, soprano, choir and orchestra, 2007)

Three Poems of Drenthe (Suze Sanders, choir and orchestra, 2008)

Soy Manuela (Micháns, soprano and orchestra, 2008–10)

Literary work
Rogelio G. (stories – Spanish)

El Mercader de Pumpuhar (The Merchant of Poompuhar, Indian stories – Spanish)

De Ogen van Meenakshi (The Eyes of Meenakshi, Indian stories – Dutch)

Madurai, Madurai (novel – Dutch)

Het Regent Rood in Buenos Aires (It Rains Red in Buenos Aires, essays – Dutch)

Poemas Terminales (Terminal Poems – Spanish/Dutch)

Nuevos Abismos (y otros poemas) (New Abysses and other poems – Spanish/Dutch)

Miniature Thangkas of Mongolia (a collector's introduction) (English)

Parabestiario (Pequeñas historias de animales - Spanish)

Del Opio de los Pueblos y otros escritos (essays) (Spanish)

Nuevos Poemas (poetry) (Spanish, Dutch, English)

Desde la Oscuridad (poetry) (Spanish/Dutch)

Volver a Madurai (stories) (Spanish)

Madurai Revisited (stories) (English version of 'Volver a Madurai')

Niet echt over Muziek (Brieven aan F.) (essays) (Dutch)

Cahier de Voisey (poetry) (French)

Cahier de la Nuit (poetry) (French)

Cahier du Néant (poetry) (French)

Cahier de Portraits (poetry) (French)

Cahier de Miroirs (poetry, French 2022)

Au-delà des Racines (essay, French, 2021)

Les Enfants de l'Eau (essay,French, 2021)

Art d'Ukraine (essay, French, 2022)

Perdu et retrouvé : L'Art de Saul Lishinsky (essay, French, 2022)

Les Yeux de Meenakshi - impressions du sud de l'Inde (stories, French version, 2022)

L'Art de l'Homme Africain (essay, French, 2020-22)

Cahier de Miroirs (poetry, French, 2022)

Further reading
Kaai, Martin: Niet bij Bach Alleen, Uitgeverij Contact, 2005, p. 136
Olof, Theo: Oskar Back en veertig jaar Nationaal Vioolconcours, Uitgeverij Thoth, 2005, p. 140, 173
Podium 1997–1998: Carlos Micháns, pp. 13–14
Don, Floris: De mars van Micháns, Preludium, Januari 2009, p. 38
 Van Merwijk, Willem: Micháns, Trois Visions Tantriques, Preludium, Januari 2009, p. 77
Eindhovens Dagblad, 7 March 2003: Geen muzak van saxofoonkwartet
De Gooi- en Eemlander, 15-05-03: Cd van de dag: Saxophone Quartets from The Netherlands
Van Swol, Els: Twee talen – Dichtende componisten (5): Carlos Micháns, Mens en Melodie Nr. 5/6, 2006, pp. 5–7
Micháns, Carlos: Het Regent Rood in Buenos Aires, CMP Utrecht, 2005
Jörg Loskill: Mozart in Zahlen und in Fasern zerlegt, Das Orchester, December 2010, p. 59

External links
carlos micháns 
lavinia meijer 
donemus 
muziek centrum nederland 
radio nederland 
duo imaginaire 
carlos cappellaro
centre culturel arteméum 
ARTEMÉUM - YouTube 
CARLOS MICHÁNS - YouTube

References

1950 births
Living people
Dutch composers
People from Buenos Aires